The Cathedral of Our Lady of Mercy is the main Roman Catholic church building of Mercedes, Uruguay. It is the see of the Roman Catholic Diocese of Mercedes since 1960.

History
Built in Neoclassical style with design of Swiss architect Antonio Petrochi, it was consecrated in 1867. It is dedicated to Our Lady of Mercy.

On the occasion of the celebrations of the bicentennial of 2011, the cathedral was refurbished, thanks to donations.

Same devotion
There are other churches in Uruguay dedicated to Our Lady of Mercy, for instance:
 Parish Church of Our Lady of Mercy and St. Jude Taddhaeus in Villa Muñoz, Montevideo
 Charity Chapel, Hospital Maciel, Montevideo
 Our Lady of Mercy Chapel in Garzón

See also
 List of Roman Catholic cathedrals in Uruguay
 Roman Catholic Diocese of Mercedes

References

External links
 
 Diocese of Mercedes - CEU 

Roman Catholic church buildings in Soriano Department
Mercedes
Roman Catholic churches completed in 1867
19th-century Roman Catholic church buildings in Uruguay
Neoclassical church buildings in Uruguay